Club Sportivo 9 de Julio, known as 9 de Julio or 9 de Julio de Río Tercero, is a sports club based in Río Tercero, Córdoba Province (Argentina). Its football team currently plays in Torneo Argentino C, the regionalised 5th level of Argentine football league system.

Basketball
The basketball team currently plays in the Torneo Nacional de Ascenso, which is the second division of the Argentine Basketball Federation. 9 de Julio home games are played at Estadio José Albert.

Notable players

Jerome Meyinsse (born 1988)

External links
Official website

 
Football clubs in Córdoba Province, Argentina
Association football clubs established in 1927
Basketball teams in Argentina
Basketball teams established in 1927
1927 establishments in Argentina